Palimna annulata is a species of beetle in the family Cerambycidae. It was described by Olivier in 1792.

References

Ancylonotini
Beetles described in 1792